Werner Meißner (born 24 April 1937) is a German economist who served as president of the Goethe University Frankfurt from 1994 to 2000.

Career

He studied business administration and economics at the University of Cologne and Stanford University, and earned a PhD in economics at the Free University of Berlin in 1964. He as a research assistant at the Department of development economics at the German Institute for Economic Research in Berlin from 1964 to 1965. He then continued his research in econometrics and statistics at Uppsala University, and earned a habilitation in 1969. In 1971 he became professor of economics at the Goethe University. He was also Managing Director of the Institute for Economic and Social Sciences (WSI) in Düsseldorf from 1992 to 1994. He served as president of the Goethe University from 1994 to 2000. He has held visiting professorships at Stockholm University (1972/74), the University of Gothenburg (1974/75), the University of Vienna (1978/79 and 1982) and the University of Toronto (1990/91). He has served as a consultant to the OECD in Paris, several UN agencies and the governments of Liberia, China and India.

References 

Academic staff of Goethe University Frankfurt
University of Cologne alumni
Free University of Berlin alumni
Stanford University alumni
1937 births
Living people
20th-century German economists